The 2019 Toronto FC season was the 13th season in the history of Toronto FC.

Season

Pre-season 
Gregory van der Wiel was sent home from the club's pre-season camp in California after "an altercation with manager Greg Vanney".

Squad
As of August 1, 2019.

International roster slots 
Toronto has seven MLS International Roster Slots for use in the 2019 season. They traded one International Spot to Columbus until the end of 2019.

|}

Transfers

In

Transferred in

Loaned in

Draft picks 
Draft picks are not automatically signed to the team roster. Only those who are signed to a contract will be listed as transfers in.

Out

Transferred out

Loan out

Competitions

Preseason

Major League Soccer

League tables

Eastern Conference

Overall

Results summary

Results by round

Matches

Major League Soccer

MLS Cup Playoffs

Canadian Championship

CONCACAF Champions League

Competitions summary
{| class="wikitable" style="text-align: center"
|-
!rowspan="2"|Competition
!colspan="8"|Record
!rowspan="2"|First Match
!rowspan="2"|Last Match
!rowspan="2"|Final Position
|-
!
!
!
!
!
!
!
!
|-
| MLS Regular Season

|March 2, 2019
|October 6, 2019
|4th in Eastern Conference, 9th Overall
|-
| MLS Cup Playoffs

|October 19, 2019
|November 10, 2019
|bgcolor=silver|Runners-up
|-
| Canadian Championship

|August 7, 2019
|September 25, 2019
|bgcolor=silver|Runners-up
|-
| Champions League

|February 19, 2019
|February 26, 2019
|Round of 16
|-
! Total

!colspan="4"|

Goals and assists 

Source: Toronto FC

Source: Toronto FC

Shutouts 

Source: Toronto FC

Honours

MLS Team of the Week

MLS Player of the Week

MLS Goal of the Week

End of Season awards

References 

Toronto FC seasons
Toronto FC
Toronto
Toronto FC
Toronto